This is a list of magazines in Ukraine.

According to law, that went into force on 16 January 2022, all print media in Ukraine must be published in the state language, Ukrainian. This rule does not apply to material published exclusively in Crimean Tatar, in other languages ​​of the indigenous peoples of Ukraine or in official languages of the European Union.

See also
List of newspapers in Ukraine

References

External links

Ukraine, List of magazines in
Magazines